, (born January 16, 1975), is a Japanese retired professional wrestler, best known under the ring name .

Career 
Candy Okutsu made her professional wrestling debut on August 4, 1992, at the age of 17, for the JWP Joshi Puroresu. During her tenure there, she would go on to win the Junior Championship twice until she retired in 1997 due to an injury.

She made her comeback on February 18, 1998, and joined ARSION. Soon after her return, she was given then gimmick of Tiger Dream, the first female version of Tiger Mask. Okutsu retired from professional wrestling for the final time on January 5, 2001.

Championships and accomplishments 
 All Japan Women's Pro-Wrestling
 AJW Junior Championship (1 time)
 Arsion
 ARS Tournament winner (1998)
 Arsion Six Women Tag Team League (2000) - with Gami and Rie Tamada
 JWP Joshi Puroresu
 JWP Junior Championship (2 times)

References

External links 
championships taken from Wrestling-Titles.com

1975 births
Living people
Japanese female professional wrestlers
Sportspeople from Hiroshima